Edward Alfred Birch (24 September 184027 November 1912) was an Irish surgeon and member of the Indian Medical Service.

Birch was superintendent of the Presidency European General Hospital in Calcutta, and from 1890 to 1892 principal of the Calcutta Medical College.

References 

1840 births
1912 deaths
Irish surgeons
Indian Medical Service officers
British people in colonial India